Wissotzky Tea is an international, family-owned tea company based in Israel with offices in London and the United States. It is the leading tea distributor in Israel. Founded in 1849 in Moscow, Russia, it became the largest tea firm in the Russian Empire. By the early 20th century, it was the largest tea manufacturer in the world. It is one of the oldest tea companies in the world.

The Wissotzky Tea Company is headed by Shalom Seidler, a descendant of Shimon Zeidler; the latter, related to Wissotzky by marriage, opened the Middle East branch of the company in 1936. The company's headquarters are located in Tel Aviv while production takes place at a factory located in the Galilee; the company employs about 400 workers.

The company enjoys a 76% hold in the local market and exports its products worldwide. Wissotzky Tea is distributed in Canada, UK, Australia, Japan and South Korea, Europe, Hungary, Russia, Ukraine and the US kosher market, entering the United States mass market with its launch of The Signature Collection; a collection of "silky pyramid sachets" containing whole loose leaf tea, fruits and herbs.

Kalman Ze'ev Wissotzky
Kalman Ze'ev Wissotzky (July 8, 1824 – May 24, 1904) was born in Starye Zagare, in the Kovno Governorate in northern Lithuania, to an Orthodox Jewish family. Following "a traditional Jewish education," Wissotsky, whose personal name later became known by various Anglicizations, married Keyla Zivya Abramson at age 18. With support from his in-laws, he studied the Talmud for three years, including six months at the renown Volozhin Yeshiva. He also was a student of Yisrael Salanter. When he was a young man he joined the "Love of Zion" movement (Hovevei Zion/Hibbat Zion), and remained an observant Jew his entire life. Wissotzky, along with his in-laws and 18 other Jewish families, set up an agricultural cooperative about 32 kilometers from Dvinsk, (today Daugavpils) Latvia. After, he was somehow allowed to move to Moscow, where he worked for Pyotr Kononovich Botkin (1781–1852) an innovative Russian tea trader. By selling tea door to door Wissotzky was able to eventually work himself up to a tea trader. While living in Moscow he gave himself a more acceptable Russian name: Wulf or Wolf Yankelevich, and his customers and partners knew him as Vasily Yakovlevich. After Botkin died Wissotzky started his own tea business in Moscow around 1858.

After moving to Moscow for economic reasons and "trading in tea" Wissotzky founded what became his signature tea company. Using his wealth
 he funded a Jewish school in Jaffa
 he was a major supporter of the Jewish National Fund
 he helped found "the Hebrew-language journal Hashiloah" ("edited by Ahad Ha'am, who also managed Wissotzky offices, first in Russia and later in London")
 in 1908 his estate gave 200,000 rubles to the construction of what is today the Technion-Israel Institute of Technology

In 1885, as a representative of Hovevei Zion, Wissotzky spent three months touring the Land of Israel. Wissotzky and his wife Keyla had four children, three daughters, including (Chana) Liba Miriam who was born 1860 and their youngest, son David, born in 1861.

History

19th century

In 1885, Kalonymus Zev Wissotzky visited the Holy Land, about which he later wrote a book. In that year, Wissotzky, who founded the tea company carrying his name in 1849, was already a wealthy and influential man, and was called "the Russian king of tea".

He had become a prominent figure in the proto-Zionist Hovevei Zion movement and was part of the leadership of the Bilu movement, founded in 1882. In 1885 the movement sent him to what is now Israel following an argument with the heads of the Jewish Yishuv, regarding the use of funds sent to the Holy Land from the Jewish diaspora. Hovevei Zion thought the money should be spent on founding new Jewish colonies, while the heads of the Yishuv, naturally disagreed. Wissotzky was given the role of touring the land in order to find a way of solving the debate, while keeping everyone happy.

Wissotzky Tea soon gained devoted customers all over the Russian Empire.

20th century

1900–1919

By 1904 the company extended its activities to Germany, France, New York and Canada. In 1907 Wissotzky established the Anglo-Asiatic company with its head offices in London, managed by Ahad Ha'am, a renowned Jewish writer and philosopher. He had joined the company in 1903 on his resignation as editor of Ha-Shiloach, a Zionist journal. The company acquired plantations in both India and Ceylon (present Sri Lanka).

From the early 1900s through 1917, Wissotzky Tea Company was the largest tea company in the world. Following the Bolshevik Revolution, in 1917 all private businesses in the Russian empire were immediately nationalized by the government, yet it took two more years to complete the takeover of Wissotzky Tea. This is mostly due to the social benefits provided by the company to their many employees.

In 1917 the company gradually ceased its operations in Russia, and the Wissotzky family emigrated to the U.S and Europe, opening branches in Italy, Danzig, Poland, and additional European countries.

During the Russian Revolution, an anti-Semitic ditty mentioning Wissotzky tea made the rounds of Russian society, spreading the idea that Russia was the victim of Jewish domination: "Tea of Wissotzky, Sugar of Brodsky, and Russia of Trotsky."

1920–1939
In the years following the Russian Revolution, Wissotzky Tea Company activities centered in London as its headquarters where it was managed by Boris Lourie and in Danzig, Poland. The operation in Danzig was run by Alexander Chmerling and Solomon Seidler, a tea specialist and scion of the Wissotzky family. Due to the vast emigration from Russia, the Polish facility catered to the demand for the tea they were accustomed to back home.

In 1936 Simon Seidler, the son of Solomon Seidler, sensed the impending danger of the war and left Poland for Palestine. In the following years, many of the family were murdered in the Holocaust and the company lost its holdings in Europe.

In 1936 Simon Seidler established a Wissotzky hub in the Middle East. Seidler began selling tea to British soldiers stationed in Mandatory Palestine, thereby promoting the brand name. Simon built a packing facility and gradually expanded the company's range of products. In 1957 Simon Seidler died and his wife Ida Seidler took over the family's tea business. Ida introduced a modern approach to manufacturing and marketing of the brand.

1940–1999
In 1945, Boris Lourie married Anna Wissotzky, and they had two sons, Serge Lourie (born 1946) and Michael Lourie (born 1948). The family holding company, Anglo-Asiatic Ltd, ceased to exist after the death of Boris Lourie, in a car crash, in 1950.

21st century
Wissotzky Tea Company acquired Zeta Olive Oil, a leading olive oil company in the Galilee and Lahmi, a leading home baked goods company in Israel with an international brand named Elsastory.

In December 2012 the three companies formed the Wissotzky Group, a gourmet and delicacies conglomerate.

Cultural references 

"Visotskis Tey" is the title of a klezmer song by Josh Waletzky, based on a Sholem Aleichem story about a mother who peddles Wissotzky's tea to earn money to buy the freedom of her son who had been drafted into the czar's army.

See also
Economy of Israel
Israeli cuisine
Russian tea culture

References

External links 
 Wissotzky Official Website (Hebrew)
 Wissotzky Tea International Website (English)
 Leah Koenig, Wissotzky Tea Company
 Tea's Success in Israel
 The Central Zionist Archives 
 The YIVO Encyclopedia of Jews in Eastern Europe
 Greetings from Zion, 1885
 My Jewish Learning

Kosher drinks
Tea brands
Drink companies of Israel
Food and drink companies established in 1849
1849 establishments in the Russian Empire
Israeli brands
Family-owned companies